Lyubov Yegorova may refer to:

 Lyubov Yegorova (ballerina) (1880–1972), Russian ballerina
 Lyubov Yegorova (cross-country skier) (born 1966), Russian cross-country skier